Dexmethylphenidate, sold under the brand name Focalin among others, is a strong central nervous system (CNS) stimulant medication used to treat attention deficit hyperactivity disorder (ADHD) in those over the age of five years. It is taken by mouth. The immediate release formulation lasts up to five hours while the extended release formulation lasts up to twelve hours.  It is the more active enantiomer of methylphenidate.  

Common side effects include abdominal pain, loss of appetite, and fever. Serious side effects may include abuse, psychosis, sudden cardiac death, mania, anaphylaxis, seizures, and dangerously prolonged erection. Safety during pregnancy and breastfeeding is unclear. Dexmethylphenidate is a central nervous system (CNS) stimulant. How it works in ADHD is unclear.

Dexmethylphenidate was approved for medical use in the United States in 2001. It is available as a generic medication. In 2020, it was the 130th most commonly prescribed medication in the United States, with more than 4million prescriptions.

Medical uses
Dexmethylphenidate is used as a treatment for ADHD, usually along with psychological, educational, behavioral or other forms of treatment. It is proposed that stimulants help ameliorate the symptoms of ADHD by making it easier for the user to concentrate, avoid distraction, and control behavior. Placebo-controlled trials have shown that once-daily dexmethylphenidate XR was effective and generally well tolerated.

Improvements in ADHD symptoms in children were significantly greater for dexmethylphenidate XR versus placebo. It also showed greater efficacy than osmotic controlled-release oral delivery system (OROS) methylphenidate over the first half of the laboratory classroom day but assessments late in the day favoured OROS methylphenidate.

Contraindications

Adverse effects

Products containing dexmethylphenidate have a side effect profile comparable to those containing methylphenidate.

Overdose

Interactions

Mode of activity
Methylphenidate is a catecholamine reuptake inhibitor that indirectly increases catecholaminergic neurotransmission by inhibiting the dopamine transporter (DAT) and norepinephrine transporter (NET), which are responsible for clearing catecholamines from the synapse, particularly in the striatum and meso-limbic system. Moreover, it is thought to "increase the release of these monoamines into the extraneuronal space."

Although four stereoisomers of methylphenidate (MPH) are possible, only the threo diastereoisomers are used in modern practice. There is a high eudysmic ratio between the SS and RR enantiomers of MPH. Dexmethylphenidate (d-threo-methylphenidate) is a preparation of the RR enantiomer of methylphenidate. In theory, D-TMP (d-threo-methylphenidate) can be anticipated to be twice the strength of the racemic product.

Pharmacology

Dexmethylphenidate has a 4–6 hour duration of effect (a long-acting formulation, Focalin XR, which spans 12 hours is also available and has been shown to be as effective as DL (dextro-, levo-)-TMP (threo-methylphenidate) XR (extended release) (Concerta, Ritalin LA), with flexible dosing and good tolerability. It has also been demonstrated to reduce ADHD symptoms in both children and adults. d-MPH  has a similar side-effect profile to MPH and can be administered without regard to food intake.

See also 
 Serdexmethylphenidate/dexmethylphenidate

Notes

References

External links 
 
 

Enantiopure drugs
Stimulants
2-Benzylpiperidines
Novartis brands
Norepinephrine–dopamine reuptake inhibitors
Nootropics
Methyl esters
Methylphenidate
Wikipedia medicine articles ready to translate
2-Piperidinyl compounds